Jamie P. Schmale  is a Canadian politician, who was elected to represent the riding of Haliburton—Kawartha Lakes—Brock in the House of Commons of Canada in the 2015 federal election.  He was re-elected in the 2019 election.

Prior to entering politics, Schmale attended Loyalist College, graduating from the Radio Broadcasting program. Schmale started his career as News Anchor and later News Director for CHUM media. He also covered news, municipal politics, and sports for 91.9 FM Radio CKLY in Lindsay, Ontario. He hosts the conservative party podcast The Blueprint where he has many conservative politicians on as guests to discuss policy and current events.

Prior to entering the House of Commons, Schmale served as former MP Barry Devolin’s Executive Assistant for 11 years (2004–11), and as his Campaign Manager in 2004, 2006, 2008 and 2011. Schmale is the current conservative critic or shadow minister for Crown-Indigenous Relations.

Electoral record

References

External links

Living people
Conservative Party of Canada MPs
Members of the House of Commons of Canada from Ontario
Canadian campaign managers
Canadian radio journalists
21st-century Canadian politicians
Year of birth missing (living people)
People from Kawartha Lakes